Shablykinsky District is an administrative and municipal district (raion), one of the twenty-four in Oryol Oblast, Russia. It is located in the west of the oblast. Its administrative center is the urban locality (an urban-type settlement) of Shablykino. Population: 8,045 (2010 Census);  The population of Shablykino accounts for 42.4% of the district's total population.

Notable residents 

Nikolay Mikhaylovich Volkov, politician, born 1951 in the village of Krasnoye

References

Notes

Sources

Districts of Oryol Oblast